Chinthalapalem is a village in Suryapet district of Telangana, India. It is located in Mallareddygudem mandal of Kodad revenue division.

References

Mandal headquarters in Suryapet district
Villages in Suryapet district